Archimedean principle may refer to:
 Archimedes' principle, a principle relating buoyancy with displacement
 Archimedean property, a mathematical property of numbers and other algebraic structures